Renato Rafael Bondi (born 20 March 1981 in São João de Meriti, Rio de Janeiro) is a Brazilian footballer. He plays for piedmontese Lega Pro Prima Divisione club Alessandria.

He arrived in Italy from Dom Pedro Bandeirante on 28 August 2002.

In June 2010 he completed his transfer from Perugia Calcio to US. Grosseto. In January 2011 he moved to the Italian 3rd tier club Alessandria.

References

External links
 CBF
 Profile at Arezzo

Brazilian footballers
Brazilian expatriate footballers
Londrina Esporte Clube players
Club Athletico Paranaense players
U.S. Salernitana 1919 players
S.S. Teramo Calcio players
A.C.R. Messina players
S.S. Arezzo players
A.C. Perugia Calcio players
Serie A players
Expatriate footballers in Peru
Expatriate footballers in Italy
Association football midfielders
People from São João de Meriti
1981 births
Living people
Juan Aurich footballers
U.S. Alessandria Calcio 1912 players
Sportspeople from Rio de Janeiro (state)